Saint John of Réôme (died ) was an early Christian abbot in what is now Moutiers-Saint-Jean in the Côte-d'Or department of France.

His feast is on 28 January.

Life

John of Réôme was born in Courtangy, France, around 450.
At the age of 20 he became a hermit at Réôme (now Ménétreux), but was joined by disciples.
When their numbers grew too great he escaped to Lérins Abbey, where he became a monk.
At Lérins Abbey he lived under the rule of Macarius of Egypt.
John was at Lérins Abbey in the period 506–510, when Porcarius I (fl. 489–495) was abbot there.
Porcarius was the author of the Monita (Counsels), a short collection of spiritual wisdom.
John was discovered and his bishop recalled him to found a monastery at Réôme in the commune of Corsaint.
The Réôme Abbey also followed the rule of Macarius, and was one of the first in Burgundy.
He had a high reputation for sanctity and was said to have worked various miracles.
He died between 539 and 544.

Jonas of Susa wrote John of Réôme's biography.
His Vita Iohannis Reomaensis shows the influence of Porcarius's Monita on him in its idealization of the spiritual life.
John's remains were preserved during the Saracen invasion in 731, and again when the Vikings invaded in 888.
In 1793 the main relics escaped being destroyed during the French Revolution.

Monks of Ramsgate account

The monks of St Augustine's Abbey, Ramsgate, wrote in their Book of Saints (1921),

Butler's account

The hagiographer Alban Butler  1710–1773) wrote in his Lives of the Fathers, Martyrs, and Other Principal Saints,

Ranbeck's account

Ægidius Ranbeck (1608–1692) wrote in his Heiliges Benedictiner-Jahr (Saints of the Order of Saint Benedict; 1677),

Notes

Sources

 

 
 

Medieval French saints
425 births
539 deaths